Whirlinurd is a platform game designed by Chris Gray and published by U.S. Gold in 1985 for the Atari 8-bit and Commodore 64 home computers. The previous game co-designed by Chris Gray was the 8-bit hit Boulder Dash.

Gameplay

The player controls one of the four Nurds and must complete 50 rooms with filled with obstacles, collecting food along the way. Each level has different obstacles (such as snakes, bugs, or bouncing balls) that must be avoided, or the player will lose one of three lives. The player-controlled Nurd can fly using the propellers on its head, but if the Nurd touches a wall or platform, it floats back to the ground and cannot fly until it touches solid land. In each room, the player must collect four pieces of food before he can proceed to the next level.

Reception
Whirlinurd received mixed reviews, many of which highlighted the game's derivativeness. Your Commodore reviewer concluded: "I found this game quite challenging to play, but I can't say that it was more exciting than the host of other games in the same vein." A Commodore User reviewer agreed: "Whirlinurd is pretty standard stuff really and very similar in concept, though not detail, to umpteen other obstacle games".

References

External links

Whirlinurd at Atari Mania

1985 video games
Atari 8-bit family games
Commodore 64 games
Platform games
Video games developed in Canada
U.S. Gold games